San Vittore alle Chiuse is a Roman Catholic abbey and church in the comune of Genga, Marche, Italy. The edifice is known from the year 1011, and constitutes a notable example of Byzantine-influenced architecture in Italy.

Description
The rear area is characterized by three high apses, the central only slightly larger. Only the northern one has maintained the original decoration with pilaster strips and small arches.

On the western side is the cylindrical tower which replaced the second square tower, crumbled in an unknown date. On the same side a forepart was added in the 13th-14th centuries with an ogival entrance.

The tambour, which protrudes from the centre of the construction, is in Armenian style.

The interior is on the Greek Cross plan inscribed within a square, with four huge columns, decorated with brick elements, supporting the dome.

References
Page on medieval art in Italy with S. Vittore alle Chiuse

11th-century Roman Catholic church buildings in Italy
Vittore alle Chiuse
Byzantine sacred architecture
Romanesque architecture in le Marche
Churches in the Province of Ancona
Roman Catholic churches in the Marche